The Dickens family are the descendants of John Dickens, the father of the English novelist Charles Dickens. John Dickens was a clerk in the Royal Navy Pay Office and had eight children from his marriage to Elizabeth Barrow. Their second child and eldest son was Charles Dickens, whose descendants include the novelist Monica Dickens, the writer Lucinda Dickens Hawksley and the actors Harry Lloyd and Brian Forster.

John Dickens was according to his son Charles "a jovial opportunist with no money sense" and was the inspiration for Mr Micawber in David Copperfield.

The family members include:
 John Dickens (1785–1851)
married Elizabeth Barrow (1789–1863); 8 children
 Frances Elizabeth Dickens (1810–1848)  married Henry Burnett in 1837  and had two sons: 
1. Henry Augustus Burnett (1839–1849)
2. Charles Dickens Kneller Burnett (1841–1881)
 Charles Dickens (1812–1870), English novelist of the Victorian era
married Catherine Hogarth (1815–1879); 10 children
1. Charles Culliford Boz Dickens (1837–1896), editor and writer, married Elizabeth Matilda Moule Evans; 8 children, including
 Mary Angela Dickens (1862–1948), journalist and novelist and  writer of Children's Stories from Dickens
 Sydney Margaret Dickens, married Thomas Whinney
 Humphrey Whinney
 Michael Humphrey Dickens Whinney (1930–2017), Church of England bishop
2. Mary "Mamie" Dickens (1838–1896) 
3. Catherine Elizabeth Macready Dickens (1839–1929), artist, married (i) Charles Allston Collins (1828–1872), (ii) Charles Edward Perugini (1839–1918); 1 child by (ii), died in infancy.
4. Walter Savage Landor Dickens (1841–1863), officer in the British Indian Army
5. Francis Jeffrey Dickens (1844–1886), member of the North-West Mounted Police
6. Alfred D'Orsay Tennyson Dickens (1845–1912), emigrated to Australia; lecturer on his father's life; 2 daughters
7. Sydney Smith Haldimand Dickens (1847–1872), a Royal Navy officer
8. Henry Fielding Dickens (1849–1933), King's Counsel and barrister; married Marie Roche (1852–1940); 7 children
 Enid Henrietta Dickens (1877–1950) married Ernest Bouchier Hawksley (1876–1931)
 Aileen Dickens Bouchier Hawksley (1907–1961) married (i) Downing (ii) Alan Napier-Clavering
 Jennifer Downing (1932–1993), actress, married Peter Forster (1920–1982)
 Brian Forster, actor, great-great-great grandson of Charles Dickens (1960-present)
 Cyril Dickens Bouchier Hawksley (1909–1976)
 Henry Dickens Bouchier Hawksley
 Joanna Mary Dickens Baldwin, great-great-great granddaughter of Charles Dickens
 Virginia (Ginny) Jane Dickens Hawksley-Lennard, great-great-great granddaughter of Charles Dickens
 Lucinda Anne Dickens Hawksley, author, great-great-great granddaughter of Charles Dickens 
 Henry Charles Dickens (1878–1966)
 Monica Enid Dickens (1915–1992), British writer, great-granddaughter of Charles Dickens
 Gerald Charles Dickens (1879–1962), admiral in the Royal Navy
 Peter Gerald Charles Dickens (1917–1987), captain in the Royal Navy
 Mark Dickens, Royal Navy officer
 Marion Evelyn Dickens
 Harry Lloyd, actor, great-great-great grandson of Charles Dickens
 David Charles Dickens (1925–2005), editor of medical books, great-grandson of Charles Dickens
 Gerald Charles Dickens, actor, great-great grandson of Charles Dickens
 Cameron Thomas Charles Dickens
 Philip Charles Dickens (1887–1964)
 Cedric Charles Dickens (1916–2006), great-grandson of Charles Dickens and steward of his literary legacy
 Cedric Charles Dickens (1889–1916), died in World War I

9. Dora Annie Dickens (1850–1851)
10. Edward Bulwer Lytton Dickens (1852–1902), emigrated to Australia

 Alfred Allen Dickens (1813)
 Letitia Dickens (1816–1893), married Henry Austin, architect and artist
 Harriet Dickens (1819–1822)
 Frederick Dickens (1820–1868), the inspiration for two different Freds in his brother's books: the jovial nephew of Ebenezer Scrooge in A Christmas Carol and the dissolute brother of Little Nell in The Old Curiosity Shop.
 Alfred Lamert Dickens (1822–1860), railway engineer
 Alfred Charles Dickens (1847–1878), Edmund Henry Dickens (1849–1910), Florence Helen Dickens (1850–1941), Katherine Louisa Dickens (1853/54–1921), Augusta Maud Colls (1857–1941)
 Augustus Dickens (1827–1866), moved to Chicago in the United States with Bertha Phillips (1829–1868)

References

Dickens family tree, myheritage.com
Dickens family tree, charlesdickenspage.com (PDF file)
Family and friends of Charles Dickens, charlesdickenspage.com

 *Family
English families
Literary families